Asthena undulata is a moth in the family Geometridae. It is found in Taiwan, Korea and Japan.

References

Moths described in 1915
Asthena
Moths of Asia